The Grande Rochère is a mountain of the Italian Pennine Alps, located north of Morgex in the Aosta Valley. Reaching a height of 3,326 metres above sea level, it is the culminating point of the group lying between the Col Ferret and the Great St. Bernard Pass.

References

External links
 Grande Rochère on Hikr

Mountains of the Alps
Mountains of Italy